"If You Wanna" is the third single by English indie rock band the Vaccines, from their debut album What Did You Expect from The Vaccines? The single was released in the United Kingdom on 18 March 2011. The single debuted at number fifty-three on the UK Singles Chart upon release in March 2011, peaking at number thirty-five in April 2012.

Music video
A music video to accompany the release of "If You Wanna" was first released onto YouTube on 23 February 2011; at a total length of two minutes and fifty-five seconds. The music video has accumulated over 10 million views, their highest viewed video on the website to date.

Track listing

Credits and personnel
Lead vocals – The Vaccines
Producers – Dan Grech-Marguerat
Lyrics –  The Vaccines
Label: Columbia Records

Chart performance

Release history

Certifications

In popular culture
It is included on the soundtrack for the video game Major League Baseball 2K12. In 2012 it was used in the adverts for Series 3 of Made in Chelsea and in June of that year, it was used in adverts for Rimmel London. Spanish beer Estrella Damm, Catalonia's largest beer brewer, used the song in their Summer of 2014 TV campaign, making this song achieve success in the Spanish music charts, peaking at number 9 position in the PROMUSICAE Top 50 Songs.

References

2011 singles
The Vaccines songs
Columbia Records singles